The RPA 12 is a fireboat built in 2002 and owned by the Port of Rotterdam.

Numbers
 IMO number: IMO 9239551
 MMSI number: 244050469
 Callsign: PE6168

External links

Fireboats
Patrol boats
Ships built in Poland
Ships built in the Netherlands
2002 ships